The women's fighting −70 kg competition in ju-jitsu at the 2001 World Games took place on 20 August 2001 at the Akita Prefectural Gymnasium in Akita, Japan.

Competition format
A total of 6 athletes entered the competition. They fought in stepladder system.

Results

Gold medal bracket

Bronze medal bracket

References

External links
 Results on IWGA website

Ju-jitsu at the 2001 World Games